Ghiyath al-Din Kaykhusraw ibn Kayqubād or Kaykhusraw II was the sultan of the Seljuqs of Rûm from 1237 until his death in 1246. He ruled at the time of the Babai uprising and the Mongol invasion of Anatolia. He led the Seljuq army with its Christian allies at the Battle of Köse Dağ in 1243. He was the last of the Seljuq sultans to wield any significant power and died as a vassal of the Mongols.

Succession
Kaykhusraw was the son of Kayqubad I and his wife Mahpari Khatun, who was Greek by origin. Although 'Kaykhusraw was the eldest, the sultan had chosen as heir the younger ‘Izz al-Din, one of his two sons by the Ayyubid princess Adila Khatun, daughter of al Adil I, sultan of Cairo and the Jazira In 1226, Kayqubad assigned the newly annexed Erzincan to Kaykhusraw. With the general Kamyar, the young prince participated in the conquest of Erzurum and later Ahlat. Kaykhusraw himself married Ghazia Khatun, the daughter of the emir of Aleppo, Al-Aziz Muhammad.

In 1236-37, raiding Mongols assisted by the Georgians devastated the Anatolian countryside as far as the walls of Sivas and Malatya. In response, Kayqubad moved to punish the Georgians. As the Seljuq army approached, Queen Russudan of Georgia sued for peace, offering her daughter Tamar in marriage to Kaykhusraw. This marriage took place in 1240.

Upon the death of Kayqubad in 1237, Kaykhusraw seized the throne with the support of the great emirs of Anatolia. The architect of his early reign was a certain Sa'd al-Din Köpek, master of the hunt and minister of works under Kayqubad. Köpek excelled at political murder and sought to protect his newfound influence at the court with a series of executions. He captured Diyarbekir from Ayyubids in 1241.

The Baba Ishak Rebellion
While the Mongols threatened the Seljuq state from the outside, a new danger appeared from within: a charismatic preacher, Baba Ishak, was fomenting rebellion among the Turkmen of Anatolia.

Nomadic Turkmen had begun moving into Anatolia a few years prior to the Battle of Manzikert. After 1071, Turkic migration into the region went largely unchecked. Both their number and the persuasive power of their religious leaders, nominally Islamized shamans known as babas or dedes, played a large part in the conversion of formerly Christian Anatolia. The Persianized Seljuq military class expended considerable effort keeping these nomads from invading areas inhabited by farmers and from harassing neighboring Christian states. The Turkmen were pushed into marginal lands, mostly mountainous and frontier districts.

Baba Ishak was one such religious leader. Unlike his predecessors, whose influence was limited to smaller tribal groups, Baba Ishak’s authority extended over a vast population of Anatolian Turkmen. It is not known what he preached, but his appropriation of the title rasul, normally applied to Muhammad, suggests something beyond mainstream Islam.

The revolt began ca. 1240 in the remote borderland of Kafarsud in the eastern Taurus Mountains and quickly spread north to the region of Amasya. Seljuq armies at Malatya and Amasya were destroyed. Soon the very heart of Seljuq Anatolia, the regions around Kayseri, Sivas, and Tokat, were under the control of Baba Ishak’s supporters. Baba Ishak himself was killed, but the Turkmen continued their rebellion against the central Seljuq authority. The rebels were finally cornered and defeated near Kırşehir, probably in 1242 or early 1243. Simon of Saint-Quentin credits the victory to a large number of Frankish mercenaries employed by the sultan.

Battle of Köse Dağ

In the winter of 1242-43, the Mongols under Bayju attacked Erzurum; the city fell without a siege. The Mongols prepared to invade Rum in the spring. To meet the threat, Kaykhusraw assembled soldiers from his allies and vassals. Simon of Saint-Quentin, an envoy of Pope Innocent IV on his way to the Great Khan, offers an account of the sultan’s preparations. He reports that the king of Armenia was required to produce 1400 lances and the Greek Emperor of Nicaea 400 lances. Both rulers met the sultan in Kayseri to negotiate details. The Grand Komnenos of Trebizond contributed 200, while the young Ayyubid prince of Aleppo supplied 1000 horsemen. In addition to these, Kaykhusraw commanded the Seljuq army and irregular Turkmen cavalry, though both had been weakened by the Baba Ishak rebellion.

The army, except for the Armenians who were then considering an alliance with (or submission to) the Mongols, assembled at Sivas. Kaykhusraw and his allies set out to the east along the trunk road towards Erzurum. On 26 June 1243, they met the Mongols at the pass at Köse Dağ, between Erzincan and Gümüşhane. A feigned retreat by the Mongol horsemen disorganized the Seljuqs, and Kaykhusraw’s army was routed. The sultan collected his treasury and harem at Tokat and fled to Ankara. The Mongols seized Sivas, sacked Kayseri, but failed to move on Konya, the capital of the sultanate.

In the months following the battle, Muhadhdhab al-Din, the sultan’s vizier, sought out the victorious Mongol leader. Since the sultan had fled, the embassy seems to have been the vizier’s own initiative. The vizier succeeded in forestalling further Mongol devastation in Anatolia and saved Kaykhusraw’s throne. Under conditions of vassalage and a substantial annual tribute, Kaykhusraw, his power much diminished, returned to Konya.

Identity
According to Rustam Shukurov, it is likely that Kaykhusraw II, who was born from a Greek mother, and was yet another Seljuk Sultan with a great interest in Greek women, "bore a dual confessional and ethnic identity".

Legacy
Kaykhusraw died leaving three sons: 'Izz al-Din Kaykaus, aged 11, son of the daughter of a Greek priest; 9-year-old Rukn al-Din Kilij Arslan, son of a Turkish woman of Konya; and 'Ala al-Din Kayqubad, son of the Georgian princess Tamar and at age 7 youngest of the three boys.

Kaykhusraw had named his youngest child Kayqubad as his successor, but because he was a weakly child, the new vizier Shams al-Din Isfahani placed Kayqubad's two underage brothers Kaykaus II and Kilij Arslan IV on the throne as well, as co-rulers. This was an attempt to maintain Seljuq control of Anatolia in the face of the Mongol threat.

Although weakened, Seljuq power remained largely intact at the time of Kaykhusraw’s death in 1246. The Mongols failed to capture either the sultan’s treasury or his capital when they had the chance, and his Anatolian lands escaped the worst of the invaders’ depredations. The real blow to the dynasty was Kaykhusrev's inability to name a competent successor. With the choice of the three young brothers, Seljuq power in Anatolia no longer lay with Seljuq princes but instead devolved into the hands of Seljuq court administrators.

Coinage
Between 638 and 641 A.H. (ca. 1240–1243) a series of remarkable silver dirhams were struck in Kaykhusraw’s name at Sivas and Konya depicting a lion and sun. While coins with images are not unknown in Islamic lands, particularly in the centuries following the Crusades, some Islamic traditions forbid representations of living things.

Several explanations of the lion and sun have been offered. One suggests that the images represent the constellation Leo, the astrological sign of Kaykhusraw's beloved Georgian wife Tamar. Another says that the lion represents Kaykhusraw and the sun Tamar.

In popular culture
In the Turkish television series Diriliş: Ertuğrul, Kaykhusraw II is portrayed by Turkish actor Burak Dakak.

Notes

References

Sources

Claude Cahen, “Keyhusrev II" Encyclopaedia of Islam, ed. by P. Bearman, et al. (Brill 2007).
Claude Cahen, Pre-Ottoman Turkey: a general survey of the material and spiritual culture and history c. 1071-1330, trans. J. Jones-Williams (New York: Taplinger, 1968), 127-38, 269-71.

 p.389

External links

Sultans of Rum
1246 deaths
Year of birth unknown
Seljuk dynasty
People from the Seljuk Empire of Greek descent